The 1982 Calder Cup playoffs of the American Hockey League began on April 7, 1982. The eight teams that qualified played best-of-five series for Division Semifinals and best-of-seven series for Division Finals. The division champions played a best-of-seven series for the Calder Cup.  The Calder Cup Final ended on May 10, 1982, with the New Brunswick Hawks defeating the Binghamton Whalers four games to one to win the Calder Cup for the only time in team history.

Playoff seeds
After the 1981–82 AHL regular season, the top four teams from each division qualified for the playoffs. However, since the fifth-placed team of the Southern division (Adirondack) earned more points than the fourth-placed team in the Northern division (Springfield), Adirondack played in the Northern division portion of the bracket in place of Springfield. The New Brunswick Hawks finished the regular season with the best overall record.

Northern Division
New Brunswick Hawks - 107 points
Maine Mariners - 101 points
Nova Scotia Voyageurs - 80 points

Southern Division
Binghamton Whalers - 98 points
Rochester Americans - 89 points
New Haven Nighthawks - 86 points
Hershey Bears - 78 points
Adirondack Red Wings - 77 points (Played in the Northern division part of the bracket in place of Springfield due to earning more points during the regular season.)

Bracket

In each round, the team that earned more points during the regular season receives home ice advantage, meaning they receive the "extra" game on home-ice if the series reaches the maximum number of games. There is no set series format due to arena scheduling conflicts and travel considerations.

Division Semifinals 
Note 1: Home team is listed first.
Note 2: The number of overtime periods played (where applicable) is not indicated

Northern Division

(N1) New Brunswick Hawks vs. (S5) Adirondack Red Wings

(N2) Maine Mariners vs. (N3) Nova Scotia Voyageurs

Southern Division

(S1) Binghamton Whalers vs. (S4) Hershey Bears

(S2) Rochester Americans vs. (S3) New Haven Nighthawks

Division Finals

Northern Division

(N1) New Brunswick Hawks vs. (N3) Nova Scotia Voyageurs

Southern Division

(S1) Binghamton Whalers vs. (S2) Rochester Americans

Calder Cup Final

(N1) New Brunswick Hawks vs. (S1) Binghamton Whalers

See also
1981–82 AHL season
List of AHL seasons

References

Calder Cup
Calder Cup playoffs